The Sophie Masloff is a fireboat in Pittsburgh, Pennsylvania. On December 16, 2016, Pittsburgh officials announced that half a million dollars had been budgeted to acquire a fireboat that was eventually named  in honor of Pittsburgh's first female mayor.  The new vessel, the city's first fireboat since 1973, was built by Lake Assault Boats, a Wisconsin firm for $542,750.

Two fires, a boat fire in 2015, and fire on a bridge undergoing maintenance, in 2016, convinced officials of the need for a fireboat.  In May 2016 local media reported that the new vessel had been provisionally budgeted at $400,000, but one year in, operational costs raised concern.  In 1973 the city sold its previous fireboat, named after former mayor Cornelius D. Scully, to Tampa, Florida, for $50,000.

The vessel was to be equipped with "sonar, forward-looking infrared cameras, and a state-of-the-art electronic suite". The vessel was delivered in August 2017.

References

Fireboats of the United States
2017 ships
History of Pittsburgh